Roy Brown (10 June 1925 – December 2004) was an English footballer who scored 20 goals from 159 appearances in the Football League playing as a full back for Darlington in the years following the Second World War. He signed from non-league club Stockton West End.

His playing style was that of a "hard man". According to his teammate Baden Powell, "Roy Brown would hit a player like an Exocet missile".

He worked at engineering firm Head Wrightson in Stockton-on-Tees.

References

1925 births
2004 deaths
Footballers from Stockton-on-Tees
Footballers from County Durham
English footballers
Association football defenders
Darlington F.C. players
English Football League players